East Lansing Public Schools is the school district for East Lansing, Michigan, USA. The district is governed by a seven-person Board of Education. Since 1973, the Board has included a student-elected, non-voting student representative from East Lansing High School. The superintendent is Dori Leyko.

Attendance area
The district, mostly in Ingham County, includes much of East Lansing, portions of Lansing and Haslett, and portions of Lansing Charter Township and Meridian Charter Township. A portion of the district is in Clinton County, where it serves portions of the parts of East Lansing in the county, as well as sections of Bath Charter Township.

Schools
 East Lansing High School - Grades 9-12
 MacDonald Middle School - Grades 6-8, mascot is Trojan, colors are blue and white.
 Glencairn Elementary School - Grades K-5, mascot is the Glencairn Terrier, colors are red and black.
 Whitehills Elementary School - Grades K-5, mascot is the Wolfie the wolf, colors are blue and white
 Donley Elementary School - Grades K-5,  mascot is Don the dolphin
 Marble Elementary School - Grades K-5, mascot is the Muskie the muskrat, colors are blue and white
 Robert L Green Elementary School - Grades K-5, mascot is a gator, colors are green and black
 Red Cedar Elementary School K-3, mascot is a raccoon, its color is red

Parent Organizations:

 District Parent Council
 ELHS Parent Council
 Glencairn School Association
 MacDonald Parent Council
 Marble Parent Council
 Pinecrest Parent Council
 Whitehills School Association
 William Donley School Association
 Red Cedar Parent Council 
 Black Parent Union (BPU)
 East Lansing Band & Orchestra Parents Association (ELBOPA)
 ELHS Boosters

References

External links
 
 Whitehills Elementary School
 Donley Elementary School

School districts in Michigan
East Lansing, Michigan
Lansing, Michigan
Education in Ingham County, Michigan
Education in Clinton County, Michigan